Arthrobacter ramosus is a bacterium species from the genus Arthrobacter which has been isolated from beech forest soil. Arthrobacter ramosus produces coproporphyrin III.

References

Further reading

External links
Type strain of Arthrobacter ramosus at BacDive -  the Bacterial Diversity Metadatabase

Bacteria described in 1960
Micrococcaceae